Med mord i bagaget is a 1959 Swedish/British thriller film co-production directed by Tom Younger and starring John Ireland, Ellen Schwiers and Birgitta Andersson. It was filmed in the English language, and was released in the United States in 1964 by Jerry Warren as No Time To Kill.

Cast
 John Ireland as Johnny Greco
 Ellen Schwiers as Nina Christians
 Birgitta Andersson as Helle
 Frank Sundström as Hopkins
 Hans Strååt as Inspector Bergman
 Ralph Brown as Jens
 Erik Strandmark as Concierge

References

External links
 

1959 films
1959 drama films
Swedish drama films
1950s Swedish films